The 1961–62 SK Rapid Wien season was the 64th season in club history.

Squad

Squad and statistics

Squad statistics

Fixtures and results

League

Cup

Cup Winners' Cup

References

1961-62 Rapid Wien Season
Rapid